Brookesmith is an unincorporated community in Brown County, Texas, United States. According to the Handbook of Texas, the community had a population of 61 in 2000. It is located within the Brownwood, Texas micropolitan area.

History
Brookesmith was named in honor of local banker Brooke Smith in 1902. A post office was established there that next year. Besides Smith, other early settlers of the community included David Smith and Aaron Lee. There were three cotton gins and other businesses in the community until cotton farming ended in the 1950s. The post office continued to operate into the 1980s, alongside a store and a gas station. Its population was recorded as 61 from 1980 through 2000. Smith Cemetery is shown on maps of the community today.

Geography

Climate
The climate in this area is characterized by hot, humid summers and generally mild to cool winters. According to the Köppen Climate Classification system, Brookesmith has a humid subtropical climate, abbreviated "Cfa" on climate maps.

Education
In the 1980s, Brookesmith had a school that hosted 12 grade levels. The Brookesmith Independent School District serves area students.

References

Unincorporated communities in Texas
Unincorporated communities in Brown County, Texas